Meesaya Murukku is a 2017 Indian Tamil-language coming-of-age comedy-drama film written and directed by Hiphop Tamizha Aadhi in his directorial debut and stars as the lead along with newcomer Aathmika as the female lead, while Vivek, RJ Vigneshkanth and Vijayalakshmi play supporting roles. The film, a partly fictionalised biopic of Adhi's early life, was released on 21 July 2017 to mostly positive reviews. and became a super-hit at the box office, grossing ₹15 crores worldwide, which is substantially high considering the fact that the film featured 17 debutant actors. It was later remade in Kannada in 2019 as Padde Huli.

Plot 
Coimbatore-based Aadhi and Jeeva have been close friends since childhood. Aadhi's father, Professor Ramachandran is very supportive of his interest in music and extra-curriculars. Aadhi joins electrical engineering after school and falls in love with his college mate, Nila who was his childhood friend. Nila is from an affluent family, and her parents are against love. Despite Nila's reservations, she too falls in love with Aadhi.

Aadhi is well known in college for his Tamil raps, and he owns a YouTube page "Hiphop Tamizha". Weeks before their final exams, Nila's family discover her relationship with Aadhi. Nila's father and uncle threaten Aadhi's family to break this relationship. After graduating, Aadhi expresses his interest to move to Chennai and become an independent musician, to his father; for which he also faces opposition. Aadhi convinces his father, promising that he will return within a year if he cannot succeed. Aadhi also promises Nila that he will seek a job after one year and marry her. Both Nila's and Aadhi's fathers accept his promises with half-heart, and Aadhi's father does not provide financial support to him.

Aadhi and Jeeva reach Chennai with instruments. They stay with their college seniors and try hard for opportunities, but all efforts fail. A year passes by, and the duo decide to return to Coimbatore. Before departure, Aadhi and Jeeva meet Ma Ka Pa Anand of Radio Mirchi, who allows him to sing "Club Le Mabbu Le" in his show, following which they come to Coimbatore.

As per his father's advice, Aadhi enrolls for an MBA degree in Chennai. Suddenly, he finds that the video of "Club Le Mabbu Le" has gone heavily viral in social media, and has drawn thousands of fan followers. Aadhi's hope is revived, and he decides to continue looking for an opportunity in the music industry and also promises his father that he will complete his post-graduation. At the same time, a big music company approaches Aadhi for a paid concert in Chennai.

Since Nila has not consented to any marriage proposals, Nila's father threatens her with his suicide and arranges a wedding for her. Aadhi gets shocked knowing that Nila's parents have fixed a wedding for her. Aadhi covertly meets Nila and requests to wait for another year, for which Nila does not agree, replying that she had already waited for a year, and all is over. Aadhi gets heartbroken and leaves to Chennai. Nila is married as per her parents' wishes, while Aadhi becomes a popular personality in hip-hop music and in five years Aadhi and Jeeva become famous music directors in cinema.

Cast 

 Hiphop Tamizha Aadhi as Adhithya Ramachandran ("Aadhi") - An engineering student, later an independent singer
 Aathmika as Vennila ("Nila") - Aadhi's love interest since his childhood
 Vivek as Ramachandran - Aadhi's father, a Tamil professor
 RJ Vigneshkanth as Jeeva - Aadhi's best friend since his childhood days
 Vijayalakshmi as Viji - Ramachandran's wife and Aadhi's mother, an economics professor
 Maalavika as Manisha - Nila's best friend since her childhood days
 Ma Ka Pa Anand as R.J. Ma Ka Pa - He helps Aadhi to become an independent singer
 Ananth Ram as Ashwin - Ramachandran's younger son, Aadhi's brother
 Sha Ra as M.Balaji M.Tech. alias "Bijili" - Aadhi's friend, A man who loved Manisha one-sidedly in school days then later became as HOD in Aadhi's college
 Madras Central Muthu as Nirmal alias "Mottai" - He who loved Nila one-sidedly since his school days also her relative, college senior
 Gajaraj as Nila's uncle
 Shweta as Shweta - Nila's elder sister
 Pradeep K Vijayan as Marshal - Aadhi's college friend
 Guhan Prakash as Arun - Nirmal's best friend
 Poovendan as Markandeyan - a senior student in Aadhi's college
 Smile Settai Anbuthasan as Sanjay - Aadhi's roommate in hostel also his best friend and Nila's colleague
 Hari Hara Krishnan as Vishnu - Aadhi's college friend
 Thameem Ansari as Shraavan - Aadhi's Opponent in Music Studio
 Vinoth Kumar as Sudhakar Anna - A college senior and Aadhi's brotherly friend who finds a singing talent in Aadhi
 Fenny Olivier as Ram - Aadhi's college friend
 Meena Vemuri as Shweta and Nila's mother
 Manoj Kumar as Shweta and Nila's father

Special appearances 
 Parithabangal Gopi in a cameo appearance
 Parithabangal Sudhakar in cameo appearance
 Nidhish Kutty as Young Aadhi
 Athish as Young Jeeva
 Raksah Shyam as Young Nila
 Mridula Shree as Young Manisha
 Ashwanth Thilak as Nila's fiancée in a cameo appearance
 Bharathan Kumanan (assistant director) in a cameo appearance
 Vishal (Hero) in a cameo appearance in Aambala music teaser video
 Sundar C. (producer) in a cameo appearance in Aambala music teaser video

Production

Development 
In August 2013, Aadhi, the lead singer of Hiphop Tamizha (HHT) revealed that he had been signed as lead for a full-length feature film based on HHT which was expected to be released by the mid of 2014. He also stated that there was a search for a suitable director to helm the spec script. During October 2016, a 90–second teaser was released on HHT's official YouTube channel, as news emerged that the film being titled as "Meesaya Murukku" produced by N. Ramasamy and Hema Rukmani for Thenandal Studio Limited, who green lit the project within five minutes of his narration and insisted him to perform as lead actor, after being impressed with his video song on Jallikattu, "Takkaru Takkaru". Apart from debuting as actor in a full-length role, Adhi also serves as writer and director besides composing the score and writing lyrics for the film. In the press meet before release of the film, Sundar C confirmed that it was partly biographical of Adhi's life. The film's title is derived from a phrase Adhi's father would often tell his son: "Thothalum jeythalum, meesaya murukku" (win or lose, always twirl your moustache).

Adhi has stated that while Meesaya Murukku is "predominantly based on real incidents", such as his five friends from the film and the character Sudhakaran being based on real people, certain liberties were taken to make the film commercially viable. The film depicts Adhi and Jeeva as having been childhood friends, whereas in reality, the duo met via Orkut in 2005, when they were teenagers.

Casting 

As revealed in 2013, Adhi continued to be lead actor and chose Aathmika to pair for him, after coming across her Facebook profile. The film also features Vivek and Vijayalakshmi in supporting roles, where the former plays the father of Adhi's character. The film features a mostly new cast and crew as per Adhi's wishes, with being Vivek the only established actor.

Filming 
Though pre-production began in August 2013, the film, as of October 2016, was reported to have completed 45 days of shoot with two songs left to be shot. Filming ended by early November 2016.

Music 

Adhi composed the music of the film. A promotional song, "Sait Ji", was released in late 2016. Although it became a viral hit on YouTube, Sundar C. received a legal notice from Ashok G Lodha of Shri All India Shwetamber Sthanakwasi Jain Conference. Lodha objected to the words "Sait Ji", meaning "affluent trader", and demanded that they be removed from the song, feeling it was "a classic example of abuse of the (Jain) community in the name of creativity and art." Sundar C obliged, and had the words removed not only from the song, but also from the finished film, and the word "Sait Ji" was replaced with "Great ji". The YouTube video itself was deleted later.

Release and reception 
Meesaya Murukku received mostly positive reviews. Sify stated, "Meesaya Murukku is a decent debut directorial and heroic outing from Adhi, the film clicks mainly because of the real life connect.". The film grossed 12.0 million from 147 shows during its first week. Baradwaj Rangan of Film Companion wrote, "Meesaya Murukku could have been a celebration of Tamil-ness [...] But the film, frustratingly, settles into an uninspired chronicle of college life: ragging, lusting for biriyani, cultural events, and romance [...] Meesaya Murukku has a few moments, but it's neither an effective romance nor a convincing coming-of-age drama."

Remake 
The film was remade in Kannada as Padde Huli (2019).

References

External links 

 

2017 films
Films scored by Hiphop Tamizha
Indian romantic musical films
2010s Tamil-language films
2010s musical comedy films
Films about singers
Biographical films about musicians
Indian films based on actual events
Films set in Chennai
Films shot in Chennai
Films shot in Pollachi
Indian biographical films
Tamil films remade in other languages
2010s hip hop films
Cultural depictions of hip hop musicians
Cultural depictions of Indian men
2010s biographical films
2017 directorial debut films
2017 comedy films